Ares 85 Hercules is a fast patrol boat made in Turkey. Oman ordered 14 boats for its Coast Guard Command.

Characteristics

Made of advanced composite material, Ares 85 Hercules was built at Ares Shipyard. The ship's class is BV, TL/HSC-N (Bureau Veritas, Turkish Lloyd/High-speed craft - Non-displacement mode). The patrol boat features a stabilized weapon station of a remotely controlled 12.7 mm machine gun. The patrol craft is equipped with electro-optical sensors, sea-based X-band Radar and radşo systems. She carries a rigid-hull inflatable boat (RHIB) on the poop deck for use in boarding a ship and search and rescue missions.

Operators
, the Royal Oman Police Coast Guard ordered on 13 November 2018 a total of 14 boats to deploy against illegal immigration and drug trafficking. The first two boats were delivered by mid December 2019.

References

2019 ships
Ships built in Antalya
Patrol vessels of Oman